Icosta are genus of biting flies in the family of louse flies, Hippoboscidae. There are 52 known species, making it the largest Hippoboscid genus. All species are parasites of birds.

Distribution
Worldwide, excluding Antarctica.

Systematics
Genus Icosta Speiser, 1905
Subgenus Ardmoeca
I. albipennis (Say, 1823)
I. ardae ardae (Macquart, 1835)
I. ardae botaurinorum (Swenk, 1916)
I. holoptera holoptera (Lutz, 1915)
I. holoptera omnisetosa Maa, 1969
I. macclurei Maa, 1969
I. massonnati (Falcoz, 1926)
I. schoutedeni (Bequaert, 1945)
Subgenus Gypoeca
I. meda (Maa, 1963)
Subgenus Icosta
I. acromialis acromialis (Speiser, 1904)
I. acromialis tuberculata (Ferris, 1927)
I. bicorna (Ferris, 1927)
I. bucerotina Maa, 1969
I. chalcolampra (Speiser, 1904)
I. coalescens (Maa, 1964)
I. corvina Maa, 1969
I. diluta Maa, 1969
I. dioxyrhina (Speiser, 1904)
I. elbeli Maa, 1969
I. fenestella Maa, 1969
I. humilis Maa, 1969
I. jactatrix Maa, 1969
I. longipalpis (Macquart, 1835)
I. malagasii Maa, 1969
I. mecorrhina (Maa, 1964)
I. plana (Walker, 1861)
I. recessa (Maa, 1964)
I. samoana (Ferris, 1927)
I. spinosa Maa, 1969
I. subdentata Maa, 1969
I. tarsata Maa, 1969
I. trita (Speiser, 1905)
I. wenzeli Maa, 1969
Subgenus Ornithoponus Aldrich, 1923
I. americana (Leach, 1817)
I. angustifrons (van der Wulp, 1903)
I. antica Maa, 1969
I. australica (Paramonov, 1954)
I. dukei (Austen, 1911)
I. hirsuta (Ferris, 1927)
I. latifacies (Bequaert, 1955)
I. lonchurae Maa, 1969
I. maquilingensis (Ferris, 1924)
I. minor (Bigot in Thomson, 1858)
I. nigra (Perty, 1833)
I. papulata Maa, 1969
I. parallelifrons (Speiser, 1902)
I. paramonovi Maa, 1969
I. plaumanni (Bequaert, 1943)
I. rufiventris (Bigot, 1885)
I. sensilis sensilis Maa, 1969
I. sensilis reducta Maa, 1969
I. simplex (Walker, 1861)
I. suvaensis (Bequaert, 1941)
I. tripelta (Maa, 1964)
I. zumpti (Maa, 1964)
Subgenus Rhyponotum
I. pilosa (Macquart, 1843)

References 

Parasitic flies
Parasites of birds
Hippoboscidae
Taxa named by Paul Gustav Eduard Speiser
Hippoboscoidea genera